Fritz Emeran Nkusi (born 28 March 1976) is a former professional footballer who played as a right-back. Born in Guadeloupe, he played for the Rwanda national team.

Club career
Born in Les Abymes, Guadeloupe, Nkusi played for Monaco B, Saint-Lô, Rennes B, Stade Poitevin, Saint-Denis Saint-Leu, KV Mechelen, Genk, Fortuna Sittard, Gueugnon, FC Brussels, La Louvière, Asteras Tripoli, Levadiakos, Saint-Leu and L'Entente SSG.

International career
Born in Guadeloupe, France, Emeran married a Rwandan woman was naturalized as a Rwandan citizen. He earned 6 caps for Rwanda between 2005 and 2007.

Personal life
He is the father of the French professional footballer Noam Emeran.

References

1976 births
Living people
People from Les Abymes
Rwandan footballers
French footballers
Guadeloupean footballers
Association football fullbacks
Rwanda international footballers
AS Monaco FC players
FC Saint-Lô Manche players
Stade Rennais F.C. players
Stade Poitevin FC players
K.V. Mechelen players
K.R.C. Genk players
Fortuna Sittard players
FC Gueugnon players
R.W.D.M. Brussels F.C. players
R.A.A. Louviéroise players
Asteras Tripolis F.C. players
Levadiakos F.C. players
Entente SSG players
Belgian Pro League players
Eredivisie players
Eerste Divisie players
Ligue 2 players
Super League Greece players
French expatriate footballers
Rwandan expatriate footballers
French expatriate sportspeople in Belgium
Rwandan expatriate sportspeople in Belgium
Expatriate footballers in Belgium
French expatriate sportspeople in the Netherlands
Rwandan expatriate sportspeople in the Netherlands
Expatriate footballers in the Netherlands
French expatriate sportspeople in Greece
Rwandan expatriate sportspeople in Greece
Expatriate footballers in Greece